Robert Thomas Trammell Jr. (born February 27, 1974) is an American politician from the state of Georgia. A member of the Democratic Party, Trammell represented the 132nd district in the Georgia House of Representatives and served as the minority leader from 2017 to 2021.

Early life and career
Trammell attended the University of Georgia for his undergraduate education where he majored in English and Political Science. He earned a Juris Doctor from the University of Virginia School of Law.

Trammell clerked the United States District Court for the Northern District of Georgia. Before entering the Georgia House, Trammell was the county attorney for Meriwether County. , Trammell lives in Luthersville, Georgia.

Political career
Trammell was first elected to the Georgia House in 2014, succeeding Carl Von Epps, who did not run for reelection. In 2018, he was reelected to his seat.

In 2017, Trammell became the Minority Leader of the Georgia House, succeeding Stacey Abrams, who resigned to focus on her gubernatorial campaign. In the 2017 legislative session, Trammell served on four committees (Government Affairs, Judiciary, Information & Audits, and Motor Vehicles.). After the 2018 elections, Trammell became the only House Democrat to represent a  seat that voted for both President Donald Trump and incoming governor Brian Kemp.

In 2020, Trammell was narrowly defeated for re-election by Republican David Jenkins.

References

External links

|-

1974 births
2020 United States presidential electors
21st-century American politicians
Georgia (U.S. state) lawyers
Living people
Democratic Party members of the Georgia House of Representatives
People from Meriwether County, Georgia
University of Georgia alumni
University of Virginia School of Law alumni